The Rapport Toer was a multi-day road cycling race held annually in South Africa from 1973 to 2000.

The race was held as a professional event on the UCI calendar from 1993 to 2000.

Winners
 1973 :  Pierre-Luigi Tagliavini
 1974 :  Arthur Metcalfe
 1975 :  Fernando Mendes
 1976 :  Venceslau Fernandes
 1977 :  Robert McIntosh
 1978 :  Marco Chagas
 1979 :  Janie Diple
 1980 :  Jan van den Berg
 1981 :  Robert McIntosh
 1982 :  Alan van Heerden
 1983 :  Robert McIntosh
 1984 :  Ertjies Bezuidenhout
 1985 :  Mark Beneke
 1986 :  Robert McIntosh
 1987 :  Alan van Heerden
 1988 :  Robert McIntosh
 1989 :  Laurens Smith
 1990 :  Willy Engelbrecht
 1991 :  Mark Beneke
 1993 :  Steffan Gotschling
 1994 :  Michael Rich
 1995 :  Michael Andersson
 1996 :  Scott Mercier
 1999 :  Michael Rich
 2000 :  Tobias Steinhauser

References

Cycle races in South Africa
1973 establishments in South Africa
Recurring sporting events established in 1973
2000 disestablishments in South Africa
Recurring sporting events disestablished in 2000
Defunct cycling races in South Africa